The 2017 Myanmar National League, also known as the 2017 Max Cement Myanmar National League, is the 8th season of the Myanmar National League, the top Burmese professional league for association football clubs since its founding in 2009. The nation's highest professional football league was shaken up at the end of the 2016 season following a series of surprise announcements by MNL-1 teams Zwegapin United and Zeyar Shwe Myay stating that they were going to drop out of the League in the next season.  Also, Manaw Myay announced the team would be disbanded, despite winning promotion to Myanmar’s premier domestic league by finishing the season's MNL-2 from the first place. A committee meeting between the Myanmar Football Federation and Myanmar National League officials held in Yangon on September 10 decided to reverse Southern Myanmar's relegation to MNL-2 in the next season, while Nay Pyi Taw received a surprise promotion into the first-tier league. Facing the loss of three squads and fears of scheduling complications for an 11-team league, MFF officials resolved to allow Southern Myanmar to remain in MNL-1, despite an 11th-place finish with only 14 points in the 2016 season. MNL-2 second-place finishers G.F.A, as well as third-place Nay Pyi Taw, were also promoted to the top league to maintain a 12-team schedule.

Although Zwegapin United initially signalled their intention to drop out of contention on August 22, team owner U Hla Htay later reversed his decision and announced that his team would continue to compete in the MNL-1, with preparations under progress for a home stadium in Hpa-An. In May 2017, Max Cement company sponsored 2017 MNL for second-half season.

Teams
A total of 12 teams are competing in the 2017 season: 10 sides from the 2016 season and two promoted teams from the 2016 Myanmar National League 2.

Stadiums

(*) – not ready to play. MNL clubs that have not had their home stadia ready to host home matches currently use Aung San Stadium and Thuwunna Stadium in Yangon.

Foreign players
The number of foreign players is restricted to four per MNL club. A team can use three foreign players on the field in each game, including a slot for a player from among AFC countries.

Personnel and sponsoring
Note: Flags indicate national team as has been defined under FIFA eligibility rules. Players may hold more than one non-FIFA nationality.

Managerial changes

League table

Results

Matches
Fixtures and results of the Myanmar National League 2017 season.

Week 1

Week 2

Week 3

Week 4

Week 5

Week 6

Week 7

Week 8

Week 9

Week 10

Week 11

Week 12

Week 13

Week 14

Week 15

Week 16

Week 17

Week 18

Week 19

Week 20

Week 21

Week 22

Season statistics

Top scorers
As of 29 October 2017.

Hat-tricks

Clean sheets
As of 12 September 2017.

Awards

Monthly awards

See also
2017 MNL-2
2017 General Aung San Shield
2017 MFF Charity Cup
2016–17 Myanmar Women League

References

External links
 Myanmar National League Official Website
 Myanmar National League Facebook Official Page

Myanmar National League seasons
Myanmar
2017 in Burmese football